HKBH may refer to:

Hong Kong Baptist Hospital, a private hospital in Kowloon Tong, Hong Kong
Hong Kong Buddhist Hospital, a community hospital in Lok Fu, Hong Kong